Sycamore is an unincorporated community in Talladega County, Alabama, United States, located near Alabama State Route 21,  north-northeast of Sylacauga. Sycamore has a post office with ZIP code 35149. Sycamore was originally called Sycamore Grove, and was named for the sycamore trees which grew at the site. The post office was established in 1876.

Sycamore was the birthplace of professional baseball player Whitey Glazner.

Demographics

Incorporated under the name of Sycamore Mills in 1924, it appeared only once on census rolls in 1930. Presumably, it either disincorporated or lost its charter sometimes in the 1930s.

References

Unincorporated communities in Talladega County, Alabama
Unincorporated communities in Alabama